Marko Roginić (born 5 September 1995) is a Croatian professional footballer who plays as a forward for Polish second-tier club GKS Katowice.

Career
At the age of 16, Roginić converted from a goalkeeper to a striker.

In 2017, he signed for Slovenian second division side Nafta 1903, scoring 21 goals in 28 league appearances during his first season there.

Before the second half of the 2018–19 season, Roginić signed for Podbeskidzie Bielsko-Biała in the Polish second division.

References

External links
 
 Marko Roginić at playmakerstats.com

1995 births
Living people
Sportspeople from Bjelovar
Association football forwards
Croatian footballers
NK Bjelovar players
NK Nafta Lendava players
Podbeskidzie Bielsko-Biała players
GKS Katowice players
Slovenian Second League players
Ekstraklasa players
I liga players
Croatian expatriate footballers
Expatriate footballers in Poland
Croatian expatriate sportspeople in Poland